Lanthanum strontium manganite (LSM or LSMO) is an oxide ceramic material with the general formula La1−xSrxMnO3, where x describes the doping level.

It has a perovskite-based crystal structure, which has the general form ABO3.  In the crystal, the 'A' sites are occupied by lanthanum and strontium atoms, and the 'B' sites are occupied by the smaller manganese atoms.  In other words, the material consists of lanthanum manganite with some of the lanthanum atoms substitutionally doped with strontium atoms. The strontium (valence 2+) doping on lanthanum (valence 3+) introduces extra holes in the valence band and thus increases electronic conductivity.

Depending on the x value in La1−xSrxMnO3, the unit cell of LSMO can be rhombohedral, cubic, or hexagonal. This change in the unit cell is explained on the basis of the Goldschmidt tolerance factor for perovskites. The change in the oxidation state of the Mn cation in LSMO can be readily observed through the position of the XPS peak for the Mn 2p3/2 orbital, and the interesting ferromagnetic ordering obtained when x=0.5 and 0.7 in the La1−xSrxMnO3. 

LSM has a rich electronic phase diagram, including a doping-dependent metal-insulator transition, paramagnetism and ferromagnetism. The existence of a Griffith phase has been reported as well.

LSM is black in color and has a density of approximately 6.5 g/cm3. The actual density will vary depending on the processing method and actual stoichiometry. LSM is primarily an electronic conductor, with transference number close to 1.

This material is commonly used as a cathode material in commercially produced solid oxide fuel cells (SOFCs) because it has a high electrical conductivity at higher temperatures, and its thermal expansion coefficient is well matched with yttria-stabilized zirconia (YSZ), a common material for SOFC electrolytes.

In research, LSM is one of the perovskite manganites that show the colossal magnetoresistance (CMR) effect, and is also an observed half-metal for compositions around x=0.3.

LSM behaves like a half-metal, suggesting its possible use in spintronics. It displays a colossal magnetoresistance effect. Above its Curie temperature (about 350 K) Jahn-Teller polarons are formed; the material's ability to conduct electricity depends on the presence of the polarons.

See also
 Solid oxide fuel cell
 magnetic tunnel junction

References

Lanthanum compounds
Strontium compounds
Manganates
Ceramic materials
Oxides
Perovskites